Thermodynamic integration is a method used to compare the difference in free energy between two given states (e.g., A and B) whose potential energies  and  have different dependences on the spatial coordinates. Because the free energy of a system is not simply a function of the phase space coordinates of the system, but is instead a function of the Boltzmann-weighted integral over phase space (i.e. partition function), the free energy difference between two states cannot be calculated directly from the potential energy of just two coordinate sets (for state A and B respectively). In thermodynamic integration, the free energy difference is calculated by defining a thermodynamic path between the states and integrating over ensemble-averaged enthalpy changes along the path. Such paths can either be real chemical processes or alchemical processes. An example alchemical process is the Kirkwood's coupling parameter method.

Derivation 

The potential energy in either system can be calculated as an ensemble average over configurations sampled from a molecular dynamics or Monte Carlo simulation with proper Boltzmann weighting. Now consider a new potential energy function defined as:

In the canonical ensemble, the partition function of the system can be written as:

In this notation,  is the potential energy of state  in the ensemble with potential energy function  as defined above. The free energy of this system is defined as:

,

If we take the derivative of F with respect to λ, we will get that it equals the ensemble average of the derivative of potential energy with respect to λ.

The change in free energy between states A and B can thus be computed from the integral of the ensemble averaged derivatives of potential energy over the coupling parameter .

Umbrella sampling is a related free energy method. It adds a bias to the potential energy. In the limit of an infinite strong bias it is equivalent to thermodynamic integration.

See also
 Free energy perturbation
 Bennett acceptance ratio
 Parallel tempering

References

Computational chemistry
Statistical mechanics